Daniel Pierre Lehu (15 February 1896 – 20 May 1979) was a French backstroke swimmer. He competed in the 100 m event at the 1920 Summer Olympics, but failed to reach the final.

References

1896 births
1979 deaths
Sportspeople from Tourcoing
French male backstroke swimmers
Swimmers at the 1920 Summer Olympics
Olympic swimmers of France